NCL Division Two
The NCL or National Conference League Division Two (known as the Kingstone Press NCL Division Two)

League winners

Rugby league in England